Senator Long may refer to:

Members of the Northern Irish Senate
John Andrew Long (1869–1941), Northern Irish Senator from 1921 to 1941

Members of the United States Senate
Chester I. Long (1860–1934), U.S. Senator from Kansas from 1903 to 1909
Edward V. Long (1908–1972), U.S. Senator from Missouri from 1960 to 1968
Huey Long (1893–1935), U.S. Senator from Louisiana from 1932 to 1935
Oren E. Long (1889–1965), U.S. Senator from Hawaii from 1959 to 1963
Rose McConnell Long (1892–1970), U.S. Senator from Louisiana from 1936 to 1937
Russell B. Long (1918–2003), U.S. Senator from Louisiana from 1948 to 1987

United States state senate members
David C. Long (born 1955), Indiana State Senate
Ed Long (politician) (1934–2017),  Oklahoma State Senate
Edward Henry Carroll Long (1808–1865), Maryland State Senate
Gerald Long (born 1944), Louisiana State Senate
John David Long (1901–1967), South Carolina State Senate
Marshall Long (1936–2018), Kentucky State Senate
Speedy Long (1928–2006), Louisiana State Senate